Alexis Zywiecki (born April 10, 1984) is a French professional football player.

Club career
Zywiecki began his career in the youth ranks of Lille. In 2006 the French defender left Lille and signed with Dijon, where he became a fixture for the club. In his first season with Dijon he appeared in 6 league matches and scored his first professional goal. During the 2007/08 season Zywiecki cemented his place as a starter and appeared in 29 matches and scored 2 goals. During the 2010/11 season Zywiecki appeared in 24 league matches as he helped Dijon gain promotion to Ligue 1.

In November 2011, Zywiecki moved to Championnat National side Étoile Fréjus Saint-Raphaël.

External links

Dijon Profile

1984 births
Living people
French people of Polish descent
French footballers
Ligue 2 players
Championnat National players
Dijon FCO players
ÉFC Fréjus Saint-Raphaël players
People from Lesquin
Association football defenders
Sportspeople from Nord (French department)
Lille OSC players
Footballers from Hauts-de-France